Thomas Müller (born 1989) is a German footballer.

Thomas Müller may also refer to:
Thomas Müller (composer) (born 1939), German conductor, composer, and pianist
Thomas Müller (skier) (born 1961), German skier
Thomas Müller (SS officer) (1902-??), German military commander
Thomas Müller-Pering (born 1958), German classical guitarist